Biko  is a Basque restaurant in Mexico City specialising in experimental molecular gastronomy owned and operated by Basque chefs Bruno Oteiza and Mikel Alonso.

Design and operations
Biko began operations in 2008. It is located in Polanco on Avenida Presidente Masaryk in Mexico City. The restaurant's layout, which incorporates both light and dark materials, was designed by Entasis Architects and inspired by "the duality and ingredients of Basque cuisine". The kitchen is run by co-owners Bruno Oteiza and Mikel Alonso, alongside Gerard Bellver. Biko specialises in techno-emotional cuisine. Dishes served at Biko include "burnt corn soup" and "foie gras topped with cotton candy", as well as "foamed cauliflower" and "almond-infused pork cheeks".

Reception
In April 2012, Time Out reviewer Felipe Viterbo gave the restaurant a five-star review, praising its "legendary" and "outstanding" reputation and highlighting the "inventiveness of the kitchen, the ranges of taste, and the ingenious surprises." In June 2016, Ryan Sutton, writing for the food website Eater included Biko in his list of "The World's 50 Best Restaurants 2016", ranking in 43rd place. In November 2016, The Daily Telegraph reviewer Stephanie Rafanelli listed Biko as one of the top five restaurants in Mexico, describing its menu as "understated culinary genius".

References

External links
 

Basque restaurants
Restaurants in Mexico City
Molecular gastronomy